Zamba (also known as Zamba, the Gorilla) is a 1949 American adventure film directed by William Berke. It starred Jon Hall and Beau Bridges.

Plot
Jenny and her son, Tommy, are flying over the Belgian Congo. They are forced to jump out of the plane and become separated from each other. Jenny is rescued by a safari. The six year old Tommy is found by Zamba, a gorilla, who adopts him.

Cast
 Jon Hall
 June Vincent as Jenny
 Beau Bridges as Tommy

Production
Zamba was made at Nassour Studios.

It was released through Eagle-Lion Films.

Reception
The Los Angeles Times said "Beau Bridges does a nice job as the kid" and "Jon Hall is engaging conscientious as the hero."

References

External links
 Zamba at TCMDB
 Zamba at IMDb
 Zamba at Letterbox DVD
 Zamba at BFI

1949 films
Eagle-Lion Films films
American adventure films
1949 adventure films
American black-and-white films
1940s English-language films
1940s American films